Yvan is a given name. Notable people with the name include:

Jacques-Yvan Morin, GOQ (born 1931), politician in Quebec, Canada
Marc-Yvan Côté (born 1947), former Quebec politician and Cabinet Minister for the Quebec Liberal Party
Maurice-Yvan Sicard (1910–2000), French journalist and far right political activist
Yvan Attal (born 1965), Israeli-born French actor and director
Yvan Bernier (born 1960), member of the Canadian House of Commons from 1993 to 2000
Yvan Blot (born 1948), French conservative political figure
Yvan Bordeleau (born 1942), the Member of the National Assembly (MNA) Quebec, Canada, for Acadie from 1989 to 2007
Yvan Bourgis (born 1979), French football defender currently playing for Stade Brest 29 in the French Ligue 2
Yvan Colonna, Corsican nationalist convicted of assassinating the prefect of Corsica, Claude Erignac on the February 6, 1998
Yvan Cournoyer (born 1943), retired Canadian hockey right winger who played in the National Hockey League
Yvan Craipeau (1911–2001), French Trotskyist activist
Yvan Decock (born 1941), Belgian sprint canoeist who competed in the early 1960s
Yvan Delporte (1928–2007), Belgian comics writer, was editor-in-chief of Spirou magazine
Yvan Ducharme (born 1937), québécois humorist and actor
Yvan Dutil, Canadian astrophysicist who created a noise-resistant coding system for extraterrestrial messages
Yvan Goll, born Isaac Lange (1891–1950), French-German poet who wrote in both French and German
Yvan Joly (born 1960), retired Canadian professional ice hockey forward
Yvan Kibundu (born 1989), French midfielder
Yvan Kyrlya (real name Kirill Ivanovich Ivanov) (1909–1943), Mari Soviet actor and poet
Yvan Lachaud (born 1954), member of the National Assembly of France
Yvan Lambatan, singer from Baguio City and former scholar of Pinoy Dream Academy
Yvan Le Bolloc'h (born 1961), French television and radio host and actor
Yvan Loubier (born 1959), Canadian politician and one of the founders of the Bloc Québécois
Yvan Muller (born 1969), French auto racing driver most noted for success in Touring Car and Ice racing
Yvan Patry (1948–1999), Québécois documentary filmmaker
Yvan Ponton (born 1945), Quebec actor, commentator and television host
Yvan Quénin (born 1920), French basketball player
Yvan Quentin (born 1970), retired Swiss football defender
Yvan Rajoarimanana (born 1988), Malagasy footballer currently plays for JS Saint-Pierroise
Yvan Randriasandratriniony, Malagasy politician, President of Tiako i Madagasikara (TIM), the ruling party
Yvan Ylieff (born 1941), Belgian politician of the Francophone Socialist Party
Yvan Paul (musician), Burundian singer, rapper and lyricist, and started his music career in 2014

French masculine given names